The Almighty Dollar is a 1923 German silent film directed by Jaap Speyer.

The film's sets were designed by Siegfried Wroblewsky.

Cast
In alphabetical order

References

Bibliography

External links

1923 films
Films of the Weimar Republic
German silent feature films
Films directed by Jaap Speyer
German black-and-white films